Bristol City Football Club is a professional football club based in Bristol, England, which compete in the , the second tier of English football. They have played their home games at Ashton Gate since moving from St John's Lane in 1904. The club's home colours are red and white, and their nickname is The Robins—a robin featured on the club's badge from 1976 to 1994 and from 2019 onwards. Their main rivals are Bristol Rovers, with whom they contest the Bristol derby, and Cardiff City, with whom they contest the cross-border Severnside derby.

Founded in 1894, the club competed in the Southern League and Western League, being crowned Western League champions in 1897–98. They were admitted into the Football League in 1901 and won the Second Division in 1905–06. They finished second in the First Division the following season, three points behind champions Newcastle United, and went on to lose to Manchester United in the 1909 FA Cup final. Relegated in 1911, they dropped to the third tier in 1922, though would claim the Third Division South title in 1922–23 and again in 1926–27. They were returned to the third tier in 1932, remaining there until they won the Third Division South again in 1954–55. Having been relegated in 1960, Bristol City won promotion from the third tier in 1964–65 and then from the second tier in 1975–76. They played four seasons in the top-flight before being relegated in three consecutive seasons by 1982.

Bristol City spent just two seasons in the  Fourth Division and went on to win the Associate Members' Cup (Football League Trophy) in 1986. Promoted out of the Third Division in 1989–90, the club were relegated in 1995 and again in 1999 after another promotion in 1997–98. Bristol City won the Football League Trophy again in 2003, and were promoted from League One in 2006–07. Relegated after six seasons in the Championship, they won the Football League Trophy for a third time in 2015 on their way to the 2014–15 League One title, and have remained in the Championship since that time.

History

Early years and early successes (1894–1911)
The club was founded in 1894 as Bristol South End and changed their name to Bristol City on adopting professionalism three years later when they were admitted into the Southern League. Finishing as runners-up in three of the first four seasons, in 1900 the club amalgamated with local Southern League rivals Bedminster F.C., who had been founded as Southville in 1887. Bristol City joined the Football League in 1901 when they became only the third club south of Birmingham (following in the footsteps of Woolwich Arsenal and Luton Town) to perform in the competition. Their first game in the Football League was on 7 September 1901 at Bloomfield Road, when Blackpool were beaten 2–0.

Winning the Second Division Championship with a record number of points when they became the first club in Football League history to win 30 league games in a season (out of 38 played) as well as equalling Manchester United's achievement of the previous season in winning 14 consecutive games (a record until 2018, also accomplished by Preston North End in 1950–51). Nicknamed the Bristol Babe at this time, they finished as runners-up in their inaugural First Division campaign (1906–07) as the only southern club to finish in the top two prior to World War I.

In 1909 they won through to their only FA Cup Final, though they were somewhat fortunate that a last-gasp spot-kick saved them from defeat in the semi-final versus Derby County at Stamford Bridge. In the final at the Crystal Palace (now the National Sports Centre) Bristol City lost to Manchester United 1–0. After a five-season stay in the top flight, despite winning 1–0 at Newcastle at the start of the 1910–11 campaign, failure to beat Everton in the season's finale brought City's first-ever taste of relegation and it was to be 65 years before top-flight status would be regained.

Ten-year stay in the Second Division (1912–22)
Bristol City would then go on to stay in Division 2 until three years after the First World War had ended, and in that time they reached the semi-finals of the 1919–20 FA Cup before being beaten 2–1 by Huddersfield Town and finished third in the Second Division in the 1920–21 season. However, in the next season they were relegated to the Third Division South.

The yo-yo era (1922–65)

The 1920s were a rocky time as City bounced between the Second Division and the Southern Section of the Third Division. The season after City were relegated, they achieved promotion back to the Second Division, before being relegated back to the Southern Section of the Third Division again the following season. After successive high finishes in the league, they were promoted again in 1926–27. However, by the 1930s they had slumped into the lower division and stayed that way until over 10 years after the Second World War. During this stay in the Third Division South, they won the Welsh Cup in 1934, beating Tranmere Rovers in the final. However, in the same year they also suffered their biggest ever league defeat, a 9–0 loss to Coventry City The 1937–38 season was the most successful season for City since they were relegated to the Third Division, coming second in the league and reaching the final of the Third Division South Cup, before losing 6–2 to Reading on aggregate. They then came eighth in the Third Division South in the final full season before the war, in which the Grandstand of Ashton Gate was destroyed by a German air raid.

In 1946–47, City recorded a record league win by beating Aldershot 9–0, although despite Don Clark scoring 36 goals in the League, City failed to get promoted that season. Harry Dolman became chairman in 1949, a post he would hold for over 30 years. An engineer who had bought out the firm he worked for, he designed the first set of floodlights installed at Ashton Gate in the early 1950s. The late 1950s were a better time for City, with a five-year stay in the Second Division, a league they returned to for a further spell in 1965.

Back among the elite (1966–80)
In 1967, Alan Dicks was appointed manager, and things gradually began to improve, with promotion to the First Division in 1976, ending a 65-year exile from the top flight.

Between 1975 and 1981 City were regular participants in the Anglo-Scottish Cup, winning the trophy in 1977–78, beating Hibernian in the semi-finals, and winning 3–2 on aggregate in the final against St Mirren (managed at the time by a relatively new manager, Alex Ferguson). St Mirren had their revenge two seasons later, with an aggregate 5–1 victory over City to become the only Scottish team to win the trophy.

City's second stint in the top flight was less successful than the club's first, with thirteenth position in 1979 being their highest finish during this era. Stars of this era included Peter Cormack, Geoff Merrick, Tom Ritchie, Clive Whitehead, Gerry Gow, Trevor Tainton and Jimmy Mann.

Decline and financial ruin (1980–82)
In 1980, the City team went back to the Second Division in the first of three relegations, their debt mounted and their financial losses increased, with two successive relegations following. Thus, in 1982, they fell into the Fourth Division, and were declared bankrupt. A new club was formed and BCFC (1982) Ltd acquired the club's player contracts. The highly paid senior players Julian Marshall, Chris Garland, Jimmy Mann, Peter Aitken, Geoff Merrick, David Rodgers, Gerry Sweeney and Trevor Tainton, who became known as the 'Ashton Gate Eight', each accepted termination of his contract for half the amount due. The club's previous owners had failed to pay its debts to many local businesses. The resulting ill will towards the club made it difficult for the new owners to obtain credit.

Revival (1982–90)
City spent two seasons in the Fourth Division before winning promotion under Terry Cooper in 1984. They consolidated themselves in the Third Division during the latter part of the 1980s, and in 1990 Cooper's successor Joe Jordan achieved promotion as Third Division runners-up to local rivals Bristol Rovers.

There was a tragedy for the club, however, in that promotion campaign. In March 1990, two months before the club sealed promotion, striker Dean Horrix was killed in a car crash barely two weeks after joining the club, and having played three league games for them.

Second tier (1990–95)
Jordan moved to Heart of Midlothian in September 1990, and his successor Jimmy Lumsden remained in charge for 18 months before making way for Denis Smith. Smith's first signing was the 20-year-old Arsenal striker Andy Cole. He was sold to Newcastle United in February 1993 and later played for Manchester United, where he collected five Premier League titles, two FA Cups and the European Cup.

Meanwhile, City remained in the new Division One (no longer the Second Division after the creation of the Premier League in 1992) and Smith moved to Oxford United in November 1993. His successor was Russell Osman. In January 1994 Osman led City to a shock 1–0 victory over Liverpool at Anfield in a third round replay in the FA Cup, a result that would cause the Liverpool manager at the time, Graeme Souness, to resign. Osman was sacked within a year of taking charge.

Joe Jordan was brought back to Ashton Gate in September 1994, but was unable to prevent relegation to Division Two.

Promotion and relegation (1995–2000)
Jordan remained at the helm for two seasons after City's relegation, but left in March 1997 after failing to get them back into Division One. Former Bristol Rovers manager John Ward took over, and achieved promotion in 1998 as Division Two runners-up. But City struggled back in Division One, and Ward stepped down in October 1998 to be succeeded by Benny Lennartsson, their first non-British manager. City were relegated in bottom place and Lennartsson was dismissed in favour of Gillingham's Tony Pulis, who lasted six months before leaving to take over at Portsmouth. During his time at Ashton Gate he was manager of perhaps the worst City side since the one that completed a hat-trick of successive relegations almost 20 years earlier.

Coach Tony Fawthrop took over until the end of the season, when Danny Wilson was appointed. Wilson was arguably the most prominent manager to take charge of a City side since Denis Smith, as he had guided Barnsley to promotion to the Premier League in 1997 and Sheffield Wednesday to a 12th-place finish in 1999.

Stuck in the third tier (2000–2005)
The early 2000s were a frustrating time for Bristol City. They were regular Division Two playoff contenders during Wilson's spell as manager. They just missed out on the playoffs in 2002, finishing 7th. The following year, Wilson almost took them to automatic promotion, finishing 3rd and winning the Football League Trophy in Cardiff in 2003. The taste of the play-offs was bitter though, losing to rivals Cardiff City 1–0 on aggregate in the semi-final. In his final year—2004—they finished in 3rd place again, and this time they reached the playoff final, but lost to Brighton & Hove Albion. He was sacked within days and replaced by veteran player Brian Tinnion.

City just failed to make the playoffs in Tinnion's first season as manager, finishing seventh, and he stepped down in September 2005 after a poor start to the season. City's form had slumped despite the addition of high-profile players, including Marcus Stewart and Michael Bridges. Yeovil Town manager Gary Johnson was recruited as his successor.

Gary Johnson (2005–2010)

Johnson arrived in September 2005, making the move from Yeovil Town, with whom he had gained two promotions. Initial results were poor, but Johnson was soon able to recover the season and finish in a comfortable 9th place.

In the 2006–07 season, Bristol City finally achieved the elusive promotion that had evaded them in their 8 years in the third tier. Promotion to the Championship was confirmed on the final day of the season with a 3–1 win against already relegated Rotherham United, securing the runners-up place in the division and resulting in automatic promotion and joyous scenes of celebration.

After a good start in the Championship, City established themselves as real contenders, sitting in 3rd place at Christmas. By the start of March, City were top of the Championship, making an improbable second successive promotion a possibility. However, a poor run ended City's chances of an automatic promotion place but qualified for the play-offs with a 4th-place finish, their highest finish since 1980. City overcame Crystal Palace 4–2 on aggregate to progress to the play-off final at Wembley Stadium, where they were beaten 1–0 by Hull City.

After a poor start in the first half of the 2008–09 season, City recovered after Christmas, peaking at 4th place in late February. After a lot of draws, the season eventually petered out and City finished the season in tenth place. The 2009–10 season saw some good results in the autumn, but heavy defeats by local rivals Cardiff City (0–6) and Doncaster Rovers (2–5) in early 2010 led to much dissatisfaction amongst fans, and Johnson left the club on 18 March 2010. Assistant manager Keith Millen took charge as caretaker manager, and led a series of good results, resulting in a second successive tenth-place finish.

Succession of managers and steady decline (2010–2013)
Steve Coppell became manager in 2010 but resigned after just two matches. Longtime assistant manager Keith Millen was announced as Coppell's successor and City fell to a 15th-place finish in 2010–11. After a poor start to the 2011–12 season, Millen left the club in October 2011.

Derek McInnes was appointed next, but after a promising start, City fell into the relegation zone, eventually surviving in 20th place, their worst since promotion in 2007. This steady decline would continue and after a poor start to the 2012–13 season, McInnes was sacked in January 2013 with City bottom of the Championship. He was replaced by Sean O'Driscoll, the club's fifth head coach in three years, but City were relegated to League One after six seasons in the Championship. O'Driscoll left with the team 22nd in League One.

Return to the Championship (2014–present)
Steve Cotterill joined the club, which ushered in the start of the revival. When he joined, the club were bottom of League One. Cotterill guided the club to safety and finished the season 12th. Had the season started when Steve Cotterill joined the club, Bristol City would have finished 5th, showing the scale of the turnaround.

Bristol City were promoted back to Championship for 2015–16 season after securing the 2014–15 Football League One title, their first league title since 1955. In their last home game, against Walsall, they finished the season in style, winning 8–2. Bristol City finished the season with 99 points, the most points in a single season in the club's history, and only 5 losses. In the same season, they also won the 2015 Johnstone's Paint Trophy after a win over Walsall, which finished 2–0 and their third league trophy, a record held by the club for having the most wins in that competition.

Despite huge success in the previous season, the club struggled on their return to the second tier. Steve Cotterill was relieved of his duties in January 2016 after a poor run of form which had seen Bristol City slip to 22nd in the Championship table. Lee Johnson, former player and son of former manager, Gary Johnson, was appointed as Bristol City's new head coach on 6 February 2016. Bristol City eventually finished in 18th place.

Bristol City started the 2016–17 season well, and after 11 games they were fifth in the league table, and City also appeared in the Last 16 of the League Cup for the first time since the 1988–89 season. However, a sharp downturn in fortunes followed over the winter, and City were only just able to accumulate enough points to ensure survival at the end of the season.

Lee Johnson remained at the helm for the following season, again making a positive early start. At the midpoint of the season, after 24 league games, they sat 2nd in the Championship, whilst also knocking out Premier League opposition in Watford, Stoke City, Crystal Palace and Manchester United to reach the semi-finals of the League Cup. However, a poor run of form followed and City finished the season in 11th place.

Bristol City ended the 2018–19 season in 8th, after experiencing a roller-coaster season including a 7-win streak. The battle for the last playoff spot came down to the final day, before Derby County managed to win their final game and clinch it. From March to June, the 2019–20 season was suspended due to the COVID-19 pandemic. Despite again challenging for the playoffs during the season, Johnson was sacked on 4 July 2020 after a run of just one win in 10 league matches. His long-time assistant, Dean Holden, was appointed as his replacement on 10 August 2020. After suffering six straight defeats in all competitions, Holden was dismissed on 16 February 2021 after just six months in charge. He was replaced by former Watford boss, Nigel Pearson.

Club identity

Bristol City have played in red and white since the 1890s, occasionally also including black. The away kit is more variable. It is traditionally white, but has also featured black or yellow. Other colours featured have included green and a purple and lime combination, the latter of which has become a fan favourite.

 The club's current crest is a modernised version of the Robin which has long ties to the fans and the club.
 The club's previous crest was a simplified version of the coat of arms of the city of Bristol.
 The club's mascots are Red and Robyn, replacing Scrumpy the robin who had been the club's mascot from 2005 until 2022.
 The club's official anthem is One for the Bristol City by the Wurzels. First released in 1976, it is the tune the team run out to at home matches. A newly recorded version of the song reached number 66 in the UK charts in September 2007.

About halfway through the 2007–08 season Bristol City manager Gary Johnson said in an interview that he hoped the team could get the whole ground bouncing. City supporters took this rallying cry on board and began to sing "Johnson says bounce around the ground" to the tune of Yellow Submarine, while continually bouncing up and down. The first game at which it was sung was in an away match against Southampton at St Mary's Stadium, and it was also sung at away at Queen's Park Rangers in February. When Bristol City fans travelled to London to play Charlton Athletic on 4 March 2008, the visiting fans, using the rail network to return home, adapted the song to "Bounce Around the Train". Since then, it has become an often used chant at Ashton Gate stadium by the fans. It was also sometimes used by supporters of Gary Johnson's former side Northampton Town, primarily at away matches. When Gary Johnson's son, Lee Johnson returned to his former club in 2016 as their new manager, he stated that he wished to inherit the chant and keep the fans singing it.

Shirt sponsors

Stadium
Bristol City have played at Ashton Gate Stadium in the south-west of Bristol, just south of the River Avon, since moving from St John's Lane in 1904. The ground currently has an all-seated capacity of 27,000. It was the home of Bedminster until the 1900 merger, and the merged team played some games there the following season, but it did not become the permanent home of Bristol City until 1904.

In the past plans were considered for expansion work to be carried out at Ashton Gate. There were also proposals to build a new 36,000-seat stadium at Hengrove Park. This was turned down in a local referendum in December 2000. In 2002, the local council was looking at possible sites for a new 40,000-seat stadium which would house both City, Rovers and Bristol Rugby, but these plans were scrapped and it is widely accepted that this would not have been welcomed by the majority of supporters from all clubs. Ashton Gate's current capacity is an average size for Championship grounds; however, in November 2007 the club announced plans to relocate to a new 30,000-capacity stadium in Ashton Vale. Plans were also in place to increase capacity to 42,000 had England's 2018 World Cup bid been successful.

The South stand opened for the 2015–16 season, with the existing Williams stand being demolished and replaced by the Lansdown stand in 2016. A new partly-artificial Desso pitch was laid and the current Dolman stand refurbished. There is still no decision on the club's request to provide a "safe standing" area, similar to those used in Germany.

A state-of-the-art training facility became operational in 2020. The Robins High Performance Centre is at Failand a short distance from Ashton Gate Stadium.

Gallery

Rivalries

Bristol City's traditional rivals are Bristol Rovers. The clubs have met 105 times, with the first meeting in 1897. Bristol City have the most wins on 43. However, the clubs have not been in the same league for a number of years; they were last in the same division in the 2000–01 season. Since then, they have only met three times; in the two-legged southern final of the 2006–07 Football League Trophy, which Rovers won 1–0 on aggregate, and in the first round of the 2013–14 Johnstone's Paint Trophy, which City won 2–1 at Ashton Gate.

City's other main rivals are Cardiff City, who play in nearby Cardiff. Despite being a local derby, it crosses the Wales–England border, making it one of the few international club derbies in the United Kingdom. The two clubs have been at similar levels in recent years, being in the same division for 10 of the last 16 seasons. This has meant frequent meetings in the league including in the semi-finals of the 2003 Second Division play-offs.

Other clubs have been seen as 'third rivals' by the fans and media. Swindon Town are seen by many as rivals, nicknamed 'Swindle' by City fans. This rivalry was most recently relevant in the 2014–15 season, when the two clubs were rivals for promotion to the Championship. Plymouth Argyle have also previously been considered rivals despite a distance of over 100 miles. The rivalry was especially relevant in the 2000s when the two clubs were the highest-ranking West Country clubs for a number of years, and meetings were seen as a decider of the 'Best in the West'. Swansea City, Newport County, Cheltenham Town and even Yeovil Town have previously been mentioned as rivals, but very rarely. However, during a fixture between Bristol City and Swansea City on 2 February 2019 at Ashton Gate, fighting took place between Bristol City and Swansea City fans resulting in a rivalry flaring up between the two sets of fans.

Records and statistics
 Record League victory – 9–0 v. Aldershot (28 December 1946)
 Record FA Cup victory – 11–0 v. Chichester City (5 November 1960)
 Record League defeat – 0–9 v. Coventry City (28 April 1934)

 Highest attendance – 43,335 v. Preston North End (16 February 1935)
 Highest attendance (at any ground) – 86,703 v. Hull City Championship Play-off Final – Wembley Stadium – (24 May 2008)
 Most League appearances – 597, John Atyeo (1951–66)
 Most League goals scored – 314, John Atyeo (1951–66)
 Most goals scored (overall) – 351, John Atyeo (1951–66)
 Most capped player – Billy Wedlock, 26 caps, England
 Most goals scored in a season – 36, Don Clark (1946–47)
 Record transfer fee paid – £8 million to Chelsea for Tomáš Kalas (July 2019)
 Record transfer fee received – £20 million from Brighton for Adam Webster (August 2019)
 Record sequence of League wins – 14; 9 September 1905 – 2 December 1905 – This was a joint league record until 2017.
 Record sequence of League defeats – 8; 10 December 2016 – 21 January 2017
 Record sequence of unbeaten League matches – 24; 9 September 1905 – 10 February 1906
 Record sequence without a League win – 21; 16 March 2013 – 22 October 2013
 Record points total for a Season – 99pts; 2014–15 Football League One

League history
Note: The numbers in parentheses are the tier of football for that season.

 1897–1901: Southern League Division One (3)
 1901–1906: Football League Second Division (2)
 1906–1911: Football League First Division (1)
 1911–1922: Football League Second Division (2)
 1922–1923: Football League Third Division (3)
 1923–1924: Football League Second Division (2)
 1924–1927: Football League Third Division (3)
 1927–1932: Football League Second Division (2)
 1932–1955: Football League Third Division (3)
 1955–1960: Football League Second Division (2)
 1960–1965: Football League Third Division (3)
 1965–1976: Football League Second Division (2)
 1976–1980: Football League First Division (1)
 1980–1981: Football League Second Division (2)
 1981–1982: Football League Third Division (3)
 1982–1984: Football League Fourth Division (4)
 1984–1990: Football League Third Division (3)
 1990–1995: Football League Second Division / Football League First Division (rebranding after the Premier League came into existence) (2)
 1995–1998: Football League Second Division (3)
 1998–1999: Football League First Division (2)
 1999–2007: Football League Second Division / Football League One (rebranded) (3)
 2007–2013: Football League Championship (2)
 2013–2015: Football League One (3)
 2015– : Football League/EFL Championship (2)

Most appearances

Most club appearances including substitute appearances in all competitions (excluding Gloucestershire Cup). Updated 29 December 2013.
Note: On 29 December 2013, Louis Carey broke Bristol City's appearance record when he came on as a substitute in the 4–1 win over Stevenage. He overtook John Atyeo after 47 years and is now the club's all-time top appearance maker.

Most goals

Correct as of 29 July 2018.

Players

First-team squad

Out on loan

Under 21 squad

List of Bristol City players from 1890s to date
For a list of all Bristol City players with a Wikipedia article, see :Category:Bristol City F.C. players.
Bedminster merged with Bristol City in 1900 for a further list of all Bedminster players with articles see :Category:Bedminster F.C. players

Player of the season

Source for 1970s winners:

Top league scorers

Club management

Coaching positions

Managerial history

Bristol City Women's F.C.

The women's team was formed in 1990 supported by the club's community officer, Shaun Parker. Their greatest achievement was reaching the semi-finals of the FA Women's Cup in 1994 and winning promotion to the Premier League under Manager Jack Edgar in 2004. Following the decision by the FA to fund only one centre of excellence in Bristol, the two senior teams were disbanded in June 2008 and the girls' youth side merged with the Bristol Academy W.F.C. The majority of the senior players, with coach Will Roberts, moved to the University of Bath in summer 2008 and now play as AFC TeamBath Ladies in the South West Combination Women's Football League.

Honours
 FA Women's Premier League Southern Division:
 Winners: 2003–04

Honours and achievements

League
Second Division / Championship (Tier 2)
 Champions (1): 1905–06 
 2nd place promotion: 1975–76
Third Division / League One (Tier 3)
 Champions (4): 1922–23, 1926–27, 1954–55,  2014–15 
 2nd place promotion: 1964–65, 1989–90, 1997–98, 2006–07
Fourth Division / League Two (Tier 4)
 4th place promotion: 1983–84
Western Football League
 Champions (1): 1897–98

Cups
FA Cup 
 Runners-up: 1908–09
Football League Trophy
 Winners: 1985–86, 2002–03, 2014–15, 
 Runners-up: 1986–87, 1999–2000
Welsh Cup
 Winners: 1933–34
Anglo-Scottish Cup
 Winners: 1977–78

References

External links

 
 Bristol City Supporters Trust

 
1894 establishments in England
Association football clubs established in 1894
Football clubs in Bristol
Football clubs in England
Southern Football League clubs
English Football League clubs
EFL Championship clubs
EFL Trophy winners